Group 21 Rugby League is a local rugby league competition, run under the control of the Country Rugby League. It covers the Upper Hunter area of New South Wales, and has three divisions, first grade, reserves and Under 18s. For sponsorship reasons, it is known as the Bengalla Group 21 Competition.

The Scone Thoroughbreds have won the most titles, winning 36 titles, and are considered one of the most successful country rugby league teams.

In 2006, the Greta-Branxton Colts joined the competition.

Teams
Due to the COVID-19 pandemic in Australia the 2020 season did not commence as originally scheduled and was cancelled in mid-June. The 2021 season was also cancelled mid-season.

Former teams 
  Muswellbrook Sharks (merged with the Rams)
  Bunnan Bears (1990s, merged with Scone)
  Quirindi Grasshoppers (5 premierships, Folded)
  Werris Creek Magpies (1980s, 2 premierships, Group 4)
  Raymond Terrace Magpies (entered competition in 2009, returned to NHRL after)
  Branxton (1 premiership)
  Army (Singleton Army base, 1940s, 1 premiership, also 1952-53 in 2nd Grade)
 Sandy Hollow (1946)
 Singleton St Patrick's (mid 1940s)
 Caroona (1990s)
Lower Grades
  Budgewoi Buff Point Bulldogs (2009, Under 18s only, returned to NHRL)
 Bendemeer (1997, 2nd Division)
 Willow Tree (late 1920s, 2nd Grade)
 Wybong (mid 1930s, 2nd Grade)
 Moonan Flat (mid 1930s, 2nd Grade)
 Jerry's Plains (late 1930s & 1948, 2nd Grade)

Competition winners

First Grade Premiers

Rugby Union
A Rugby Union competition ran in the Upper Hunter from 1897 to 1914, and in 1919, as a direct predecessor to the Rugby League competition. Aberdeen, Muswellbrook, Scone and in some years Murrurundi participated. In the early stages Finals appear to be held only when the top two teams were equal on points at the conclusion of the round-robin matches. Union matches were played during the World War One, in the seasons 1915 to 1918, on an irregular and social basis. Singleton played in competitions centred in Maitland..

Junior League 
The following clubs field teams in Group 21 Junior Competitions:

  Aberdeen Tigers
  Denman Devils
  Merriwa Magpies
  Muswellbrook Rams
  Scone Thoroughbreds
  Singleton Greyhounds

See also

Rugby League Competitions in Australia

References

External links and Sources
Group 21 homepage
 Rugby League Week at State Library of NSW Research and Collections

Rugby league competitions in New South Wales